Milrem Robotics is an Estonian robotic vehicle manufacturer. Their primary products are the THeMIS UGV, the Multiscope UGV and a robotic combat vehicle designated as the Type-X.

Leadership 
Kuldar Väärsi is the CEO of Milrem Robotics and Veiko Vaher is the COO.

History 
Milrem Robotics was established in 2013. Development on the first unmanned ground vehicle (UGV) began late 2014. The first UGV (THeMIS) was introduced at DSEI 2015 in London. An upgraded THeMIS was introduced at the 2019 Defence and Security Equipment International conference.

In 2019 the Estonian Defence Forces deployed the THeMIS UGV to a combat zone, Mali, for the first time as part of a French led counter-terrorism Operation Barkhane.

Product lines

THeMIS

The THeMIS is a medium-sized military UGV intended to provide support for dismounted troops by serving as a transport platform, remote weapon station, IED detection and disposal unit etc. The vehicle’s open architecture gives it multi-missions capability. The THeMIS has been integrated with a number of weapons and weapons systems including the FGM-148 Javelin, deFNder Medium, PROTECTOR RWS, IMPACT and Brimstone anti-tank system.

Multiscope
The Multiscope is the civilian version of the THeMIS UGV. and combines know-how collected from extensive testing of the THeMIS during military exercises in harsh environments and provides faster, cost-effective and flexible solutions for the commercial and government sector, including civil engineering, security and especially fire and rescue applications. The Multiscope is ideal for industries who wish to eliminate the physical risk to their workforce and want to benefit from automating processes.

Type-X

The Type-X is an in-development 12-tonne class UGV.

References

External links 

 
 
 

Robotics companies of Estonia
Companies established in 2013
Estonian brands